Sandra Julien (born Sandra Calaputti 14 February 1950 in Toulon, France) is a French actress.  Her acting career only lasted a few years, but one of the films she is remembered for is Le Frisson des Vampires (The Shiver of the Vampires), a film by director Jean Rollin.

Career
Julien's acting career only lasted about five years. She got her first role in Le Frisson des Vampires in 1970, and that was her only time working with director Jean Rollin. Rollin had also worked with her husband, Pierre Julien.
She mainly appeared in erotic films. Max Pécas gave her the leading role in I Am a Nymphomaniac and in I Am Frigid... Why?, opposite Marie-Georges Pascal. She left the sets after the advent of hardcore pornography.

Filmography

References

External links

1950 births
Living people
French film actresses
Actors from Toulon